Pettibonesia is a genus of annelids belonging to the family Polynoidae.

The species of this genus are found in Northern Europe.

Species:
 Pettibonesia furcosetosa (Loshamn, 1981)

References

Annelids